Head of Muir is a village located in the Falkirk council area, Central Scotland, between Denny and Dennyloanhead.

Its local primary school is Head of Muir primary school.

Local amenities include a small shop operated by Scotmid and a butcher's shop called Corkhills.

References

External links

Falkirk.gov - Chacefield Wood

Villages in Falkirk (council area)
Denny, Falkirk